Pennsylvania State Senate District 24 includes parts of Berks County and Montgomery County. It is currently represented by Republican Tracy Pennycuick.

District profile
The district includes the following areas:

Berks County

 Amity Township
 Bally
 Bechtelsville
 Boyertown
 Colebrookdale Township
 District Township
 Douglass Township
 Earl Township
 Hereford Township
 Longswamp Township
 Pike Township
 Rockland Township
 Topton
 Washington Township

Montgomery County

 Collegeville
 Douglass Township
 East Greenville
 Green Lane
 Limerick Township
 Lower Frederick Township
 Lower Pottsgrove Township
 Lower Salford Township
 Marlborough Township
 North Wales
 New Hanover Township
 Pennsburg
 Perkiomen Township
 Pottstown
 Red Hill
 Schwenksville
 Skippack Township
 Towamencin Township
 Trappe
 Upper Frederick Township
 Upper Gwynedd Township
 Upper Hanover Township
 Upper Pottsgrove Township
 Upper Salford Township
 West Pottsgrove Township

Senators

Recent election results

References

Pennsylvania Senate districts
Government of Berks County, Pennsylvania
Government of Bucks County, Pennsylvania
Government of Montgomery County, Pennsylvania